Nature Astronomy is a peer reviewed scientific journal published by Nature Portfolio. It was first published in January 2017 (volume 1, issue 1), although the first content appeared online in December 2016. The editor-in-chief is May Chiao, who is a full-time professional editor employed by the journal. The founding editors of this journal, in addition to May Chiao, were Paul Woods, Luca Maltagliati and Marios Karouzos.

Abstracting and indexing
The journal is abstracted and indexed in:
Astrophysics Data System (ADS)
Science Citation Index Expanded
Scopus

According to the Journal Citation Reports, the journal has a 2021 impact factor of 15.647, ranking it 5th out of 69 journals in the category "Astronomy & Astrophysics".

References

External links
 Nature Astronomy Journal Website

Nature Research academic journals
Astronomy journals
Publications established in 2017
Monthly journals
English-language journals